L. imbricata may refer to:
 Litsea imbricata, a plant species endemic to New Caledonia
 Lockhartia imbricata, an orchid species found from Trinidad to tropical South America

See also
 Imbricata